Michael Willi Kraft (born 23 April 1966) is a German former professional footballer who played as a goalkeeper. He played for 1. FC Köln, FC Gütersloh and FC Carl Zeiss Jena in Germany and Bakırköyspor in the Süper Lig and is formerly the goalkeeping coach of Fenerbahçe.

References

External links
 
 Michael Kraft at TFF.org

1966 births
Living people
German footballers
Association football goalkeepers
Bundesliga players
2. Bundesliga players
Süper Lig players
1. FC Köln players
1. FC Köln II players
Bakırköyspor footballers
FC Carl Zeiss Jena players
FC Gütersloh 2000 players
Fenerbahçe S.K. (football) non-playing staff
Beijing Guoan F.C. non-playing staff
Association football goalkeeping coaches
SV Werder Bremen non-playing staff
Eintracht Frankfurt non-playing staff
German expatriate footballers
German expatriate sportspeople in Turkey
Expatriate footballers in Turkey